Bakala is a sub-prefecture and town in the Ouaka Prefecture of the southern-central Central African Republic. It is located near the geographic center of the country.

History 
On 30 November 2016 Bakala was captured by FPRC armed group after battle with UPC group. It was recaptured by UPC on 11 December and again captured by FPRC on 11 January 2017. In April 2017 Bakala was reportedly under joint control of FPRC and Anti-balaka. The town was recaptured by government fores on 10 April 2021.

References 

Sub-prefectures of the Central African Republic
Populated places in Ouaka